The 1985–86 Pittsburgh Penguins season was the Penguins' 19th season in the National Hockey League (NHL). The Penguins did not qualify for the playoffs.

Offseason

Regular season

Final standings

Schedule and results

|- style="background:#fcf;"
| 1 || Oct 10 || Montreal Canadiens || 5–3 || Pittsburgh Penguins || Civic Arena || 0–1–0 || 0
|- style="background:#fcf;"
| 2 || Oct 12 || Philadelphia Flyers || 4–2 || Pittsburgh Penguins || Civic Arena || 0–2–0 || 0
|- style="background:#cfc;"
| 3 || Oct 15 || Minnesota North Stars || 2–3 || Pittsburgh Penguins || Civic Arena || 1–2–0 || 2
|- style="background:#ffc;"
| 4 || Oct 16 || Pittsburgh Penguins || 5–5 OT || Chicago Black Hawks || Chicago Stadium || 1–2–1 || 3
|- style="background:#fcf;"
| 5 || Oct 19 || Pittsburgh Penguins || 3–4 || Quebec Nordiques || Quebec Coliseum || 1–3–1 || 3
|- style="background:#cfc;"
| 6 || Oct 23 || Pittsburgh Penguins || 5–4 || Toronto Maple Leafs || Maple Leaf Gardens || 2–3–1 || 5
|- style="background:#cfc;"
| 7 || Oct 24 || Toronto Maple Leafs || 4–6 || Pittsburgh Penguins || Civic Arena || 3–3–1 || 7
|- style="background:#ffc;"
| 8 || Oct 26 || Quebec Nordiques || 4–4 OT || Pittsburgh Penguins || Civic Arena || 3–3–2 || 8
|- style="background:#fcf;"
| 9 || Oct 29 || Hartford Whalers || 4–3 || Pittsburgh Penguins || Civic Arena || 3–4–2 || 8
|- style="background:#fcf;"
| 10 || Oct 30 || Pittsburgh Penguins || 3–6 || Detroit Red Wings || Joe Louis Arena || 3–5–2 || 8
|-

|- style="background:#ffc;"
| 11 || Nov 2 || Pittsburgh Penguins || 4–4 OT || Montreal Canadiens || Montreal Forum || 3–5–3 || 9
|- style="background:#fcf;"
| 12 || Nov 4 || New York Rangers || 4–2 || Pittsburgh Penguins || Civic Arena || 3–6–3 || 9
|- style="background:#fcf;"
| 13 || Nov 6 || Washington Capitals || 4–1 || Pittsburgh Penguins || Civic Arena || 3–7–3 || 9
|- style="background:#fcf;"
| 14 || Nov 8 || Pittsburgh Penguins || 3–5 || New Jersey Devils || Izod Center || 3–8–3 || 9
|- style="background:#cfc;"
| 15 || Nov 9 || Chicago Black Hawks || 1–3 || Pittsburgh Penguins || Civic Arena || 4–8–3 || 11
|- style="background:#cfc;"
| 16 || Nov 13 || Pittsburgh Penguins || 6–3 || Vancouver Canucks || Pacific Coliseum || 5–8–3 || 13
|- style="background:#fcf;"
| 17 || Nov 16 || Pittsburgh Penguins || 3–4 OT || Los Angeles Kings || The Forum || 5–9–3 || 13
|- style="background:#fcf;"
| 18 || Nov 19 || Pittsburgh Penguins || 3–4 || Washington Capitals || Capital Centre || 5–10–3 || 13
|- style="background:#fcf;"
| 19 || Nov 20 || Washington Capitals || 3–1 || Pittsburgh Penguins || Civic Arena || 5–11–3 || 13
|- style="background:#cfc;"
| 20 || Nov 22 || Winnipeg Jets || 1–8 || Pittsburgh Penguins || Civic Arena || 6–11–3 || 15
|- style="background:#fcf;"
| 21 || Nov 24 || Pittsburgh Penguins || 4–7 || Philadelphia Flyers || The Spectrum || 6–12–3 || 15
|- style="background:#cfc;"
| 22 || Nov 27 || Toronto Maple Leafs || 1–7 || Pittsburgh Penguins || Civic Arena || 7–12–3 || 17
|- style="background:#cfc;"
| 23 || Nov 30 || New York Rangers || 4–5 || Pittsburgh Penguins || Civic Arena || 8–12–3 || 19
|-

|- style="background:#cfc;"
| 24 || Dec 2 || Pittsburgh Penguins || 6–0 || New York Rangers || Madison Square Garden (IV) || 9–12–3 || 21
|- style="background:#cfc;"
| 25 || Dec 4 || Detroit Red Wings || 2–5 || Pittsburgh Penguins || Civic Arena || 10–12–3 || 23
|- style="background:#cfc;"
| 26 || Dec 6 || Pittsburgh Penguins || 3–1 || Buffalo Sabres || Buffalo Memorial Auditorium || 11–12–3 || 25
|- style="background:#fcf;"
| 27 || Dec 7 || New Jersey Devils || 5–1 || Pittsburgh Penguins || Civic Arena || 11–13–3 || 25
|- style="background:#fcf;"
| 28 || Dec 10 || Pittsburgh Penguins || 4–7 || New York Islanders || Nassau Veterans Memorial Coliseum || 11–14–3 || 25
|- style="background:#ffc;"
| 29 || Dec 11 || New York Islanders || 4–4 OT || Pittsburgh Penguins || Civic Arena || 11–14–4 || 26
|- style="background:#fcf;"
| 30 || Dec 14 || Pittsburgh Penguins || 4–5 || Hartford Whalers || XL Center || 11–15–4 || 26
|- style="background:#cfc;"
| 31 || Dec 15 || Pittsburgh Penguins || 5–2 || New York Rangers || Madison Square Garden (IV) || 12–15–4 || 28
|- style="background:#cfc;"
| 32 || Dec 17 || Calgary Flames || 3–4 || Pittsburgh Penguins || Civic Arena || 13–15–4 || 30
|- style="background:#cfc;"
| 33 || Dec 19 || Pittsburgh Penguins || 4–3 OT || Minnesota North Stars || Met Center || 14–15–4 || 32
|- style="background:#fcf;"
| 34 || Dec 21 || Philadelphia Flyers || 4–2 || Pittsburgh Penguins || Civic Arena || 14–16–4 || 32
|- style="background:#fcf;"
| 35 || Dec 22 || Pittsburgh Penguins || 2–3 OT || Philadelphia Flyers || The Spectrum || 14–17–4 || 32
|- style="background:#cfc;"
| 36 || Dec 26 || Boston Bruins || 3–4 || Pittsburgh Penguins || Civic Arena || 15–17–4 || 34
|- style="background:#fcf;"
| 37 || Dec 28 || New York Islanders || 4–2 || Pittsburgh Penguins || Civic Arena || 15–18–4 || 34
|- style="background:#cfc;"
| 38 || Dec 31 || Pittsburgh Penguins || 8–4 || St. Louis Blues || The Checkerdome || 16–18–4 || 36
|-

|- style="background:#fcf;"
| 39 || Jan 1 || Pittsburgh Penguins || 4–7 || Chicago Black Hawks || Chicago Stadium || 16–19–4 || 36
|- style="background:#cfc;"
| 40 || Jan 6 || New Jersey Devils || 3–4 || Pittsburgh Penguins || Civic Arena || 17–19–4 || 38
|- style="background:#cfc;"
| 41 || Jan 8 || Los Angeles Kings || 3–7 || Pittsburgh Penguins || Civic Arena || 18–19–4 || 40
|- style="background:#fcf;"
| 42 || Jan 9 || Pittsburgh Penguins || 0–9 || New York Islanders || Nassau Veterans Memorial Coliseum || 18–20–4 || 40
|- style="background:#ffc;"
| 43 || Jan 11 || Buffalo Sabres || 3–3 OT || Pittsburgh Penguins || Civic Arena || 18–20–5 || 41
|- style="background:#cfc;"
| 44 || Jan 15 || New York Islanders || 3–6 || Pittsburgh Penguins || Civic Arena || 19–20–5 || 43
|- style="background:#cfc;"
| 45 || Jan 18 || Pittsburgh Penguins || 5–2 || St. Louis Blues || The Checkerdome || 20–20–5 || 45
|- style="background:#cfc;"
| 46 || Jan 19 || Minnesota North Stars || 2–3 || Pittsburgh Penguins || Civic Arena || 21–20–5 || 47
|- style="background:#cfc;"
| 47 || Jan 22 || Pittsburgh Penguins || 7–4 || Edmonton Oilers || Northlands Coliseum || 22–20–5 || 49
|- style="background:#fcf;"
| 48 || Jan 24 || Pittsburgh Penguins || 3–4 || Vancouver Canucks || Pacific Coliseum || 22–21–5 || 49
|- style="background:#fcf;"
| 49 || Jan 25 || Pittsburgh Penguins || 2–5 || Calgary Flames || Scotiabank Saddledome || 22–22–5 || 49
|- style="background:#ffc;"
| 50 || Jan 28 || Philadelphia Flyers || 2–2 OT || Pittsburgh Penguins || Civic Arena || 22–22–6 || 50
|- style="background:#cfc;"
| 51 || Jan 29 || Pittsburgh Penguins || 4–1 || New Jersey Devils || Izod Center || 23–22–6 || 52
|-

|- style="background:#fcf;"
| 52 || Feb 1 || Pittsburgh Penguins || 3–4 || New York Islanders || Nassau Veterans Memorial Coliseum || 23–23–6 || 52
|- style="background:#fcf;"
| 53 || Feb 2 || Pittsburgh Penguins || 2–3 || Boston Bruins || Boston Garden || 23–24–6 || 52
|- style="background:#cfc;"
| 54 || Feb 8 || New Jersey Devils || 0–4 || Pittsburgh Penguins || Civic Arena || 24–24–6 || 54
|- style="background:#cfc;"
| 55 || Feb 12 || Washington Capitals || 1–8 || Pittsburgh Penguins || Civic Arena || 25–24–6 || 56
|- style="background:#cfc;"
| 56 || Feb 15 || Vancouver Canucks || 4–9 || Pittsburgh Penguins || Civic Arena || 26–24–6 || 58
|- style="background:#ffc;"
| 57 || Feb 16 || Pittsburgh Penguins || 5–5 OT || New Jersey Devils || Izod Center || 26–24–7 || 59
|- style="background:#cfc;"
| 58 || Feb 19 || Winnipeg Jets || 2–5 || Pittsburgh Penguins || Civic Arena || 27–24–7 || 61
|- style="background:#cfc;"
| 59 || Feb 21 || Pittsburgh Penguins || 7–3 || Detroit Red Wings || Joe Louis Arena || 28–24–7 || 63
|- style="background:#fcf;"
| 60 || Feb 22 || St. Louis Blues || 5–3 || Pittsburgh Penguins || Civic Arena || 28–25–7 || 63
|- style="background:#cfc;"
| 61 || Feb 24 || Los Angeles Kings || 5–6 OT || Pittsburgh Penguins || Civic Arena || 29–25–7 || 65
|- style="background:#cfc;"
| 62 || Feb 26 || Buffalo Sabres || 2–5 || Pittsburgh Penguins || Civic Arena || 30–25–7 || 67
|- style="background:#fcf;"
| 63 || Feb 27 || Pittsburgh Penguins || 3–8 || New York Rangers || Madison Square Garden (IV) || 30–26–7 || 67
|-

|- style="background:#cfc;"
| 64 || Mar 1 || Hartford Whalers || 1–5 || Pittsburgh Penguins || Civic Arena || 31–26–7 || 69
|- style="background:#fcf;"
| 65 || Mar 4 || Pittsburgh Penguins || 3–6 || Calgary Flames || Scotiabank Saddledome || 31–27–7 || 69
|- style="background:#fcf;"
| 66 || Mar 7 || Pittsburgh Penguins || 3–5 || Edmonton Oilers || Northlands Coliseum || 31–28–7 || 69
|- style="background:#fcf;"
| 67 || Mar 9 || Pittsburgh Penguins || 3–5 || Winnipeg Jets || Winnipeg Arena || 31–29–7 || 69
|- style="background:#fcf;"
| 68 || Mar 11 || Pittsburgh Penguins || 3–5 || Washington Capitals || Capital Centre || 31–30–7 || 69
|- style="background:#fcf;"
| 69 || Mar 12 || Boston Bruins || 5–2 || Pittsburgh Penguins || Civic Arena || 31–31–7 || 69
|- style="background:#ffc;"
| 70 || Mar 15 || New York Rangers || 2–2 OT || Pittsburgh Penguins || Civic Arena || 31–31–8 || 70
|- style="background:#fcf;"
| 71 || Mar 17 || Washington Capitals || 5–3 || Pittsburgh Penguins || Civic Arena || 31–32–8 || 70
|- style="background:#cfc;"
| 72 || Mar 19 || Pittsburgh Penguins || 7–3 || New Jersey Devils || Izod Center || 32–32–8 || 72
|- style="background:#fcf;"
| 73 || Mar 20 || Pittsburgh Penguins || 1–5 || Philadelphia Flyers || The Spectrum || 32–33–8 || 72
|- style="background:#cfc;"
| 74 || Mar 22 || Pittsburgh Penguins || 7–4 || Quebec Nordiques || Quebec Coliseum || 33–33–8 || 74
|- style="background:#fcf;"
| 75 || Mar 26 || Edmonton Oilers || 8–3 || Pittsburgh Penguins || Civic Arena || 33–34–8 || 74
|- style="background:#fcf;"
| 76 || Mar 29 || Pittsburgh Penguins || 3–4 || Montreal Canadiens || Montreal Forum || 33–35–8 || 74
|-

|- style="background:#fcf;"
| 77 || Apr 1 || Pittsburgh Penguins || 3–5 || Washington Capitals || Capital Centre || 33–36–8 || 74
|- style="background:#fcf;"
| 78 || Apr 2 || New York Islanders || 7–2 || Pittsburgh Penguins || Civic Arena || 33–37–8 || 74
|- style="background:#fcf;"
| 79 || Apr 5 || Philadelphia Flyers || 4–3 OT || Pittsburgh Penguins || Civic Arena || 33–38–8 || 74
|- style="background:#cfc;"
| 80 || Apr 6 || Pittsburgh Penguins || 5–4 OT || New York Rangers || Madison Square Garden (IV) || 34–38–8 || 76
|-

|- style="text-align:center;"
| Legend:       = Win       = Loss       = Tie

Playoffs
The Penguins failed to make the playoffs again for the fourth straight year, two points behind the fourth place Rangers for the final spot from the Patrick Division.

Player statistics
Skaters

Goaltenders

†Denotes player spent time with another team before joining the Penguins.  Stats reflect time with the Penguins only.
‡Denotes player was traded mid-season.  Stats reflect time with the Penguins only.

Awards and records
 Mario Lemieux became the first person to score 70 assists in a season for the Penguins. He did so in a 7–3 win over Detroit on February 21.
 Mario Lemieux became the first person to score 80 assists and also 120 points in a season for the Penguins. He did so with the same assist in a 5–1 win over Hartford on March 1.
 Mario Lemieux became the first person to score 130 points in a season for the Penguins. He did so in a 7–3 win over New Jersey on March 19.
 Mario Lemieux became the first person to score 90 assists in a season for the Penguins. He did so in a 3–8 loss to with Edmonton on March 26.
 Mario Lemieux became the first person to score 140 points in a season for the Penguins. He did so in a 5–4 win over New York on April 6.
 Mario Lemieux established a new franchise record for assists (94) and points (141) in a season. He topped the previous highs of 111 points (Pierre Larouche, 1976) and 67 assists (Syl Apps, Jr. 1976 and Randy Carlyle 1981).

Transactions

The Penguins were involved in the following transactions during the 1985–86 season:

Trades

Additions and subtractions

Draft picks 

The 1985 NHL Entry Draft was held on June 15, 1985, in Toronto, Ontario.

Farm teams

See also
 1985–86 NHL season

References

External links

Pittsburgh Penguins seasons
Pittsburgh
Pittsburgh
Pitts
Pitts